The Latvian National Museum of Natural History is a natural history museum in Riga, Latvia. It was founded in 1845 as the Riga Naturalist Society.

The museum contains the following Departments:
 Custodial 
 Botany
 Zoology
 Geology and Palaeontology
 Technological Support
 Communications
 Administration

External links
Official site

Natural history museums
Museums in Riga
Museums established in 1845
1845 establishments in the Russian Empire